This article lists the squads for the 1996 AFC Asian Cup played in United Arab Emirates. Players marked (c) were named as captain for their national squad. Number of caps counts until the start of the tournament, including all pre-tournament friendlies. Player's age is their age on the opening day of the tournament, which was 4 December 1996.

Group A

Indonesia

Head coach:  Muhammad Danurwindo

Kuwait

Head coach:  Milan Macala

South Korea

Head coach:  Park Jong-Hwan

United Arab Emirates

Head coach:   Tomislav Ivic

Group B

Iran

Head coach:  Mohammad Mayeli Kohan

Iraq

Head coach:  Yahya Alwan

Saudi Arabia

Head coach:  Nelo Vingada

Thailand

Head coach:  Arjhan Srong-ngamsub

Group C

China

Head coach:  Qi Wusheng

Japan

Head coach:  Shu Kamo

Syria

Head coach:  Yuriy Kurnenin

Uzbekistan

Head coach:  Bokhodyr Ibragimov

External links
 Complete results of 1996 Asian Cup at rsssf.com
 Complete results of 1996 Asian Cup at footballzz.co.uk
 Squad list at worldfootball.net

AFC Asian Cup squads